InstaBook Corporation manufactures book on demand equipment. It was founded in 1997, and is located in Gainesville, Florida.

History
InstaBook Maker is a system specifically designed to download, print and bind a book in one step on site for a retail customer. The first model of the InstaBook Maker was presented at the BookExpo in LA in 1999.  Patents for this technology were secured in the US and around the world by its inventor, Victor Celorio.(US PATENTS 6012890, 6213703, Chinese Patent 97705, Mexican Patent 241092, others).

On March 28, 2012, in decision number 2012-000170 the Board of Patent Appeals rejected some of the objections presented by a third party to Celorio patent 6,2137,03, and adopted all others essentially leaving very little of the original patent intact. The full test of the Board of Patent Appeals can be found at: https://casetext.com/admin-law/ex-parte-6213703-et-al. Celorio decided to appeal to the UNITED STATES COURT OF APPEALS FEDERAL CIRCUIT. And on 2013, the Federal Court of Appeals affirmed the USPTO decision in full and awarded costs to the third party to be paid by Celorio. The decision of the US Court of Appeals can be found at: https://cases.justia.com/federal/appellate-courts/cafc/13-1194/13-1194-2013-10-22.pdf?ts=1411173123.

InstaBook installed the first book on demand equipment in a bookstore in Canada in 2001. The first bookstore with an InstaBook in the US was the Bookends store in Ridgewood, New Jersey.

References

Manufacturing companies based in Florida